Shamsul Hoque Tuku (born 31 May 1948) is a Bangladesh Awami League politician and incumbent Deputy speaker of Jatiya Sangsad. He is the former State Minister of the Government of Bangladesh for Ministry of Home Affairs in the second Sheikh Hasina led Awami League government. Tuku was elected to Parliament from Pabna-1 in 2008, 2014 and 2018.

Biography
Tuku was born on 31 May 1948. He has master's degrees in communication, arts, and law. He is a lawyer.

Tuku was elected to Parliament for the first time in the ninth Bangladesh parliamentary election, in 2008, representing constituency Pabna-1. In July 2009, he was appointed as a State Minister for the Home Ministry by the cabinet council of the Bangladesh Government. His house in Pabna district, which was rented out to the local passport office, was fire damaged by members of Bangladesh Jamaat-e-Islami in 2013.

Tuku was re-elected to Parliament in the tenth Bangladesh parliamentary election, in 2014. He is a member of three Parliamentary standing committees: Ministry of Home Affairs; Law, Justice and Parliamentary Affairs; and Public Accounts. On 28 August 2022, he has been selected for the vacant post of Deputy Speaker of Jatiyo Sangsad.

Personal life 
Tuku's brother, Abdul Baten, is the mayor of Bera Municipality. In October 2020, Baten was accused of "misbehaving" with the upazila nirbahi officer.

References

Living people
1948 births
20th-century Bangladeshi lawyers
Awami League politicians
Home Affairs ministers of Bangladesh
11th Jatiya Sangsad members
10th Jatiya Sangsad members
Place of birth missing (living people)